DKE may refer to:
 DKE Records, a record label associated with Hall & Oates
 Data & Knowledge Engineering, an academic journal
 Delta Kappa Epsilon, an American student organization
 German Commission for Electrotechnical, Electronic & Information Technologies of DIN and VDE, a German standards organization
 Dresden-Kemnitz station (DS100 code), a railway station in Dresden, Germany
 , a brand of early , a type of radio
 Department of Data Science and Knowledge Engineering, at Maastricht University, Netherlands
 Dihakho Station (station code), a railway station in Assam, India
 Jubilee Airways (ICAO code), a British airline